Dorian Andronic (born 16 October 1989) is a Romanian former football player. He started as a center back at Cetatea Suceava when he was 16 years old. In the winter of 2007 he was bought by SC Vaslui. He made his debut in Liga I in a 1–0 victory against FC Steaua București. He scored his first goal against FC Timişoara in the 2007/2008 season. He didn't improve as much as it were expected, as he played only 5 games in the last season.

Career honours

FC Vaslui 

UEFA Intertoto Cup
Winner: 2008

References

External links

1989 births
Living people
Romanian footballers
FC Vaslui players
FCV Farul Constanța players
Association football defenders
Sportspeople from Suceava